The R.102 (originally referred to as Project H) was a British airship planned in 1930 but never built.
The development of R.102 resulted from the Imperial Airship Scheme, when it became apparent that the R100 and R101 airships then being built would not be capable of economic operation over the planned routes. After the crash of the R.101 in October 1930, the project was reevaluated and further airship development abandoned.

Design and development

The 1930 proposal was, starting in 1931, to provide a scheduled airship service from Cardington to Karachi and Montreal using R100 and R101, the former to be lengthened like R.101. In 1934 R.102, and a sister-ship, R.103 would become available. By 1935 the airships would offer a weekly service to Ismailia in Egypt and monthly direct return services to Montreal and Karachi via Ismalia. The service was to be extended to Australia in 1936. 
 
Following the loss of the R.101 on 5 October 1930 and influenced by the economic climate of the Great Depression  the Cabinet decided to abandon British airship development on 31 August 1931, although Cardington would still keep a watching brief on overseas developments.  Had the R.102 been built, it would have been the largest airship of all time, measuring 18 feet longer than the Hindenburg.

Specifications (provisional)

See also

Notes

References

External links
 

1930s British airliners
Airships of the United Kingdom
Abandoned civil aircraft projects of the United Kingdom